PSLV-D3 was the overall third and second successful mission of the PSLV program by Indian Space Research Organisation. The vehicle carried IRS-P3 satellite which was deployed in the Sun-synchronous Low Earth orbit.

Launch
PSLV-D3 was launched at 4:53 a.m. IST on 21 March 1996 from Satish Dhawan Space Centre  (then called "Sriharikota Launching Range"). The vehicle successfully achieved orbit, placing the IRS-P3 satellite in the sun-synchronous orbit.

See also
 Indian Space Research Organisation
 Polar Satellite Launch Vehicle

References 

Spacecraft launched in 1994
Polar Satellite Launch Vehicle